The Minolta A-mount camera system was a line of photographic equipment from Minolta introduced in 1985 with the world's first integrated autofocus system in the camera body with interchangeable lenses. The system used a lens mount called A-mount, with a flange focal distance 44.50 mm, one millimeter longer, 43.5 mm, than the previous SR mount from 1958. The new mount was wider, 49.7 mm vs. 44.97 mm, than the older SR-mount and had a longer flange focal distance making old manual lenses incompatible with the new system. Minolta bought the autofocus technology of Leica Correfot camera which was partly used on the a-mount autofocus technology. The mount is now used by Sony, who bought the SLR camera division from Konica Minolta, Konica and Minolta having merged a few years before.

The Minolta A-mount system was at first marketed as Maxxum in North America and α (Alpha) in Japan and the rest of Asia. In Europe, early Minolta A-mount cameras were initially identified by a 4 digit number followed by AF. The name Dynax was introduced later with the "i" cameras, the second generation of Minolta A-mount camera.

It was originally based around a selection of three 35 mm single-lens reflex (SLR) bodies, the 5000, 7000 and 9000. The system also included an extensive range of auto-focus lenses, flashes, a motor drive and other accessories.  Compatible equipment was made by a number of third parties.
The mount itself was both electronically communicating with the lens as well as used a mechanical arm to control aperture and a screw-type drive to control focusing.

In the following years, many different cameras and accessories were added to the range.

The last film-based AF SLRs produced by Minolta were the Maxxum 50 (a.k.a. Dynax 30 and Dynax 40) and the Maxxum 70 (a.k.a. Dynax 60 and α-70). The Dynax/Maxxum/α branding was also used on two Konica Minolta digital SLRs, prior to the acquisition by Sony (7D, 5D).

When Sony acquired Konica Minolta's camera technologies in 2006 they chose the "α" brand name (already in use by Minolta in Asia) for their new "Sony α" digital SLR system. The Dynax/Maxxum/α lens mount (which was retained from the old cameras) is now officially part of the "α mount system".

Film SLR bodies

Timeline

First generation

7000

The Minolta 7000 was the first successful auto focus SLR using a motor integrated in the camera body.
It was released in 1985 together with 11 lenses, 2 flashguns and a complete lineup of accessories.
The 7000 featured one AF-sensor, shutter speeds of 1/2000 to 30 seconds, flash sync speed of 1/100s, exposure compensation of +/-4EV in 0.5 exposure steps, center-weighted light metering mode and two frames per second film advance. The Maxxum 7000, when first released had the crossed x's in the name Maxxum. Exxon had a registered trademark for the crossed x's and sued Minolta, forcing Minolta to change the way the name was shown.

9000
	
The Minolta 9000, a camera aimed at professionals, was released later the same year, and featured shutter speeds of 1/4000 to 30 seconds, center-weighted and spot lightmetering, exposure compensation of +-4EV in 0.5 exposure steps and a flash sync speed of 1/250s. Unlike the 7000, the 9000 had no internal motordrive and thus holds the position as the world's only autofocusing SLR with manual winding, but with the addition of the motor drive MD-90 a photographer could get up to 5 frames per second. The 9000 had a very extensive range of accessories, including several different backs, winding options and screens. The 9000 had a unique function in that, if combined with the Minolta Data Receiver DR-1000 and the Minolta Flash Meter IV, readings could be made on the flash meter and transferred wirelessly to the camera, and the camera then triggered from the flash meter.

5000
The Minolta 5000, Minolta's entry level camera and essentially a downscaled 7000, was released in 1986. It featured shutter speeds of 1/2000 to 4 seconds and BULB, center-weighted lightmetering, exposure compensation of +1EV, flashsync speed of 1/100s and fully automatic programs.

Second generation

7000i

This camera had the usual Program automatic exposure, Shutter priority automatic exposure, Aperture-priority automatic exposure and metered manual exposure modes (standard on the 7000), TTL autoflash (like the 7000) and added a newer faster and more sensitive AF system, faster film advance, new flash hot-shoe that was incompatible with the older flash system (although an adapter was available and the 7/8000i supported the x000-era CG-1000 "flash handle" for backwards compatibility).  The 7000i supported the Maxxum lens system, and other previously introduced  accessories such as the remote cords.

Perhaps more innovative and unusual than any other improvement was the expansion card system.  While also used in other models in the i-series, some models in the xi-series, and the 700si, the Minolta Creative Expansion Card System debuted on this model. The expansion card system provided a way to add features to the camera, such as multi-spot metering, or re-program the built-in AE modes to favor faster shutter speeds or smaller apertures, such as the sports action card.  While most of the cards' functions and effects could be duplicated by a technically knowledgeable photographer using the camera without the expansion cards, the card system was handy for less technically skilled users who just wanted to photograph their child's soccer/football team for example, without needing to learn about exposure settings and the effect they might have on how a picture "looked". These cards were the forerunners of today's "picture/creativity modes". This camera was aimed at the same market as the 7000.

5000i

Built-in flash with a zoom head, programmed AE and metered manual exposure out of the box, adding the A/S expansion card provided two additional AE modes, Shutter-priority and Aperture-priority.  A fairly direct replacement for the earlier 5000.

8000i
Essentially added a PC flash-sync terminal, ME capability, spot metering and faster shutter to the 7000i feature-set.  This camera was not a direct replacement for the earlier 9000, and lacked some features such as depth-of-field preview, but offered some additional features that were not on the 7000i. This camera was available in white as well, together with matched white 35-105 lens and 5200i flash.

3000i
An entry level camera, exposure mode was program AE only, with a high-speed program option, no Creative Expansion Card support.  An even more basic Maxxum, this camera was basically for the point-and-shoot user that wanted a system SLR camera with interchangeable lenses and more powerful flashes, but didn't want the features on, or didn't want to pay for the 5000i, 7000i, 8000i cameras.

Third generation

2xi
An entry-level model, the plastic-bodied 2xi features a program mode (P-mode), Shutter priority mode (S-mode), aperture priority mode (A-mode), and fully manual mode (M-mode). There is also a self-timer  feature, a manual / auto focus switch for use with the series of auto focus lenses, hot shoe mount compatible with i and xi flashes, and a tripod mount.

3xi

QTsi

Introduced in 1999. Also known as the Dynax 303si. An entry-level, plastic-bodied camera manufactured in Malaysia. Key specifications:

 Viewfinder: 90% field of view; 0.75X magnification
 Shutter speeds 30 to 1/2000th sec.; flash sync: 1/90th (1/45th with wireless flash)
 AF sensitivity range: EV -1 to 18 (ISO 100)
 AF control: single-shot, continuous, automatic AF-mode selection
 Exposure modes:  P, five Subject Program modes (Portrait, Landscape, Close-up, Sports and Night Portrait)
 Metering range: EV 4-20 (ISO 100, f/1.4 lens)
 Film speed setting: Automatic: ISO 25 to 5000 using DX-coding; Flash: ISO 25-1000
 Drive modes: single frame, continuous (1 frame/sec.), self timer
 Built-in flash: GN 12 (ISO 100 in meters); 28mm angle of view; approx. 3 second recycling time
 Batteries:  two CR2 lithium cells
 Dimensions: 135 x 90 x 58.5mm
 Weight: 340g (w/o batteries)

GT

5xi
 Type:  35 mm SLR with autofocus, autoexposure, built-in motor drive and flash.
 Format:  24 × 35 mm cartridge film.
 Lenses:  Minolta AF, Minolta AFxi.
 Lens mount:  Minolta A-type bayonet mount.
 Viewfinder:  Eye-level pentaprism, 92% (vertical), 94% (horizontal) coverage.
 Focusing screen:  Acute-Matte, fixed.
 Viewfinder information:  Focus/spot metering frames, flash on/ready indicators; camera shake warning; focus signal; shutter speed and aperture LEDs; exposure compensation warning; spot metering indicator.
 Metering system:  8-segment honeycomb metering, spot metering.
 Exposure modes:  Program AE with shift, aperture-priority, shutter-priority, metered manual.
 Metering range:  EV0-20 (honeycomb); EV3-20 (spot).
 Film speed setting:  DX coding, lSO  in 1/3step increments. Non-DX coded film defaults to ISO 100.
 Autofocus system:  TTL phase-detection system with horizontal CCD array; activated by eye-start. Built-in (flash) AF illuminator, range 1–5 m.
 Focus modes:  Single shot, predictive; powered manual.
 Shutter:  Electronically controlled vertical-travel focal-plane type.
 Shutter speeds:  1/2000s - 30sec, plus bulb in 1/2 stop increments.
 Flash:  Built-in retractable type, GN 14 (Metric, ISO 100). Flash activates automatically when needed in P mode, otherwise when popped up. Flash will only combine with external flash when used off-camera.
 Flash synchronisation:  1/90s (P,A modes), 1/60s (S mode). Slow-shutter synch possible by pressing spot metering button.
 Self-timer: Electronic, 10-second delay, cancellable. When raised, flash pulses as warning before shutter releases.
 Film transport:  Auto to first frame, single frame advance or continuous 1 fps. Auto rewind at end of roll (film wound right back into cassette).
 Exposure compensation:  +/- 4 stops in half stop increments.
 Automatic exposure bracketing:  Possible via EB Card.
 Multiple exposure:  Possible via ME Card.
 Creative expansion cards: Travel, child, depth control, sports action, portrait, close-up, multiple exposure, exposure bracketing, flash bracketing.
 Power source:  2CR5 6V lithium battery.
 Dimensions:  153(W) × 99(H) × 69(D) mm.
 Weight:  575 g (with battery, without lens).

7xi

9xi
	

The Minolta 9xi was the flagship of the xi series cameras.
At its time, the fastest camera in the world; shortest shutter time 1/12000, 4,5 fps without an add on winder.
Add on battery pack was available.

Fourth generation

300si
This camera is known by several names and variations, it features full automatic program, and 5 preset programs. Manual control is not an option. It has a prominent visible built in flash and was released in 1995, the ISO settings range , the focal plane shutter speeds: 30 seconds - 1/2000. It is considered an entry level camera because of the lack of manual, shutter, or aperture, priority capability.

350si
A version of the 300si offering an additional panoramic mode with part of the viewfinder and film opening masked off top and bottom. This can be selected by a switch while there is film in the camera, so that a film may contain a mixture of normal and panoramic pictures. Sold as the Alpha 101si in Japan.

400si/450si panorama date

500si/550si panorama date
The Minolta Dynax 500si (European name) was introduced in 1994. Budget version of Minolta Dynax 700si with built-in programs instead of program cards

505si/505si super

600si
The Minolta 600si Classic (a.k.a. Maxxum 600si and α-507si), introduced in 1995, featured classic controls for most functions.  This meant that the 600si had many dials and knobs rather than a menu system.  The top plate of the camera included separate dials for exposure compensation, flash compensation, exposure mode and drive mode, and other functions were controlled by further knobs elsewhere.  The advantage to the photographer was that almost all settings were readily identified even when the camera was not switched on - just like a classic camera.

The 600si did not have a P (panic) mode to reset all functions, nor was it possible to store favourite combinations of settings or use cards from the 700si card system. The 600si could be used with the VC-600 vertical control grip for a second set of controls and additional battery options.

650si
The 650si was effectively a 600si with the addition of date/time imprinting and a built-in panorama mask, restricting the film image to 12 mm × 36 mm.

700si

800si

The Minolta 800si, released in 1997, was the flagship of the si series cameras before the 5th generation single digit series. It can be seen as a stop-gap measure to fill the "semi-pro" niche between the 1993 700si and the 2000 Dynax 7. This camera has a very high powered pop-up flash, one of the most powerful built-in flashes ever made. The 800si added a lot more features over its predecessor the 700si, at the expense of the 700si's card system, which most consumers at this time considered of little use due to the widespread integration of features into camera bodies. The 700si's vertical control grip, the VC-700, can also fit the 800si.

Fifth generation

9

The Dynax/Maxxum/α-9, Minolta's last professional film body, was released in 1998 and started the 5th and final generation of their 35 mm autofocus camera line. The camera is constructed with a zinc and aluminium cast frame covered by SUS304 stainless steel panels, uncommon for cameras, and can tolerate large amounts of abuse at the expense of some added weight. A vertical control grip (VC-9) mirroring the cameras basic controls was available. The camera had a maximum shutter speed capability of 1/12000 second due to carbon-fiber reinforced shutter blades, and a maximum frame rate of 5.5 frames/second. The camera just preceded the release of the SSM (SuperSonic Motor) lenses and D distance encoded lens/flash system, and as a result an upgrade was available in order to support the SSM lenses and D function. This upgrade was in the form of a complete systems board, unlike digital cameras which are usually upgradeable by software. Like all autofocusing Minolta SLR cameras it used the Minolta 'A-series' bayonet lens mounting system.

The 9 was the first Minolta to use a radically different user layout, with many buttons, instead of the "computerized" interfaces tried earlier especially in the i and xi series. The more classic interface was first "tested" in a si series camera, the 600si Classic (which in essence was a 700si with a different interface) and garnered positive response. This interface was then refined and proved to be a major hit with consumers and reviewers alike, was largely copied over to the Konica Minolta Maxxum 7D, and also kept in later advanced amateur/professional Sony digital cameras. The vertical control grip was also the first to feature a slightly lowered handgrip and shutter button, for better ergonomy in vertical shooting. This style of grip has also been featured in later Minolta and Sony models.

Also a titanium version of this camera was available as the 9Ti. The 9Ti had the same features as its regular counterpart with the exception of the silver finish and lighter weight of the titanium shell, a "wet type" rubber grip, knobs with relief labels in orange color instead of the standard model's knobs with phosphorescent paint, and a brown leather shoulder strap. It also received four additional custom functions for a total of 25.
A lighter magnesium vertical grip VC-9M was available as well.
The camera came out in 1999 in limited quantities only and with 4-digit serial numbers. It was sold out in 2001 already. A small batch of Dynax 9Ti bodies with 8-digit serial numbers in the #199011xx range and lacking the accessories surfaced in Germany between 2002 and 2006 (presumably assembled by Minolta's European Service Center in Bremen from 9Ti spare parts), dubbed the Dynax 9Ti II to distinguish it from the original 4-digit limited series of the 9Ti.

In the second and third hardware revision of the 9, including all SSM/ADI upgraded units, a special procedure (requiring no tools) can be utilized to reconfigure the camera to behave like the 9Ti and subsequently invoke the limited model's extra functions also in the black model.

7
The 7 is generally considered even more advanced in many respects than the Dynax/Maxxum/α-9, making it the most advanced Dynax/Maxxum/α. Amongst its many unusual features, it had an STF function which could emulate the Smooth Trans Focus effect by doing multiple exposures while varying the aperture — something done neither before nor since. The 7 was the first camera to support SSM lenses. Perhaps most noteworthy and radical was a huge LCD navigation display on the rear of the camera's film door. This offered a full operational view without the need of constant referral to the operating manual. It also eased operation of the 35 custom functions to change camera settings. Also, the 7 featured a plethora of dials and buttons as opposed to the "hold button while turning wheel" interface many of its other contemporaries offered. This interface was a direct evolution from the 9 and 600si Classic and later continued in other pro- and semi-pro models.

This Maxxum offered the maximum shutter speed of 1/8000, a maximum frame rate of 4 frames/second, autofocus control with a 16-bit CPU coupled with a 14-segment honeycomb-pattern metering and the support of Minolta's ADI (Advanced Distance Integration) with its "D" series lenses. Also for the professional–enthusiast was the vertical control grip (VC-7) that replicated some basic controls for vertical shooting and extending shooting time with extra batteries. There was also a film chamber lock to avoid accidental exposure of film that is still loaded. The Dynax/Maxxum/α-7 was noted to be a good camera among many photographers and rave reviews on the Internet and magazines alike.

In some markets a limited edition of the camera became available in 2001 as Dynax 7 Limited and α-7 Limited (there was no Maxxum variant of this model). It featured a larger internal film data memory, a slightly more refined finish of the exterior and golden-colored labels. Like the 9Ti it had 4-digit serial numbers, except for the Chinese α-7 Limited II model, which had 8-digit serial numbers. Also featuring a larger internal memory, there was a variant of the normal α-7 named α-7 CNM (Chinese navigation model) specifically for the Chinese market.

5
The 5 was an easy-to-use, compact, and feature-packed film camera using core technologies from the Minolta Dynax/Maxxum/α-7. The Dynax/Maxxum/α-5 incorporated advanced autofocus (AF) technology, powerful film drive, relatively fast shutter speeds, and several creative features including 14 custom functions, into a small and light silver-colored SLR camera body. Like all other autofocus Minolta cameras, it used the same lenses initially offered in the mid-1980s. Also available was a battery grip (BP-200) for extended 35 mm film shooting.

The Maxxum 3 and Maxxum 4 are based on this Minolta, being less feature-rich entry-level cameras. This fifth generation (Dynax/Maxxum/α-3/4/5, 7 & 9) were the last full generation of film cameras that Minolta made with only two more film cameras (Dynax 60, Maxxum/α-70 and Dynax 30/40, Maxxum/α-50) produced before merging with Konica and leaving the 35 mm camera business all together.

Sixth generation

40/50
First of two sixth generation Minolta film cameras marketed as the Dynax 40 in Europe and the Maxxum 50 in the USA. Entry level camera which took the crown as lightest and smallest AF 35 mm SLR.

60/70
The last Minolta film camera, marketed as the Dynax 60 in Europe and the Maxxum 70 in the US. Essentially a Maxxum 5 with relatively minor changes (notably the addition of a PASM dial).

Digital SLR bodies

5D

7D

Lenses

List of Minolta A-mount lenses:

Third-party lenses
 Sigma
 Tamron

See also
 Background to the Minolta autofocus SLR range
 List of Minolta A-mount cameras
 Minolta V-mount
 Minolta SR-mount
 Sony E-mount
 List of Sony A-mount lenses

References

External links

dyxum.com
9000.org
photoclubalpha.com
mhohner.de

Products introduced in 1985
 
 
 
Japanese inventions